Gaandharvam is a 1978 Indian Malayalam-language film, directed by B. K. Pottekkad. The film stars Prem Nazir, Adoor Bhasi, Bahadoor and Major Sundararajan in the lead roles. The film has musical score by M. S. Baburaj.

Cast
Prem Nazir 
Adoor Bhasi 
Bahadoor 
Major Sundararajan 
Vincent

Soundtrack
The music was composed by MS Baburaj and the lyrics were written by P. Bhaskaran and Mankombu Gopalakrishnan.

References

External links
 

1978 films
1970s Malayalam-language films
Films scored by M. S. Baburaj